The following lists events that happened during 1902 in South Africa.

Incumbents

Cape Colony
 Governor of the Cape of Good Hope: Walter Hely-Hutchinson.
 Prime Minister of the Cape of Good Hope: John Gordon Sprigg.

Natal
 Governor of the Colony of Natal: Henry Edward McCallum.
 Prime Minister of the Colony of Natal: Albert Henry Hime.

Orange Free State / Orange River Colony
 State President of the Orange Free State: Martinus Theunis Steyn (until 31 May).
 Governor of the Orange River Colony and High Commissioner for Southern Africa: Alfred Milner, 1st Viscount Milner.
 Lieutenant-Governor of the Orange River Colony: Hamilton Goold-Adams.

South African Republic / Transvaal
 State President of the South African Republic: Paul Kruger (until 31 May) (in exile);  Schalk Willem Burger (acting until 31 May).
 Governor of the Transvaal and High Commissioner for Southern Africa: Alfred Milner, 1st Viscount Milner.
 Lieutenant-Governor of the Transvaal: Sir Arthur Lawley.

Events
February
 27 – Breaker Morant and Peter Handcock are executed in Pretoria for the murder of Boer prisoners of war near Louis Trichardt.

March
 7 – The Burghers win their last battle over British forces, with the capture of a British general and 200 of his men.

April
 4 – The town Concordia in Namaqualand surrenders to Boer forces.
 8 – O'okiep is besieged by Boer forces under General Jan Smuts.

May
 1 – Boer commandos use the locomotive Pioneer to propel a truck-load of dynamite into the besieged O'okiep.
 4 – Boer General Jan Smuts meets with the British General Herbert Kitchener at Kroonstad.
 6 – Qulusi-Zulu chief Sikhobobo with a 300-strong impi attacks Field-cornet Potgieter and 70 Boers while sleeping, leaving 56 Burghers and 52 Zulus dead in the Battle of Holkrans.
 31 – The Second Boer War ends with the signing of the Treaty of Vereeniging at Melrose House in Pretoria.

December
 Mahatma Gandhi arrives in Durban from Bombay.

Unknown date
 James Stevenson-Hamilton is appointed the first warden of the Sabie Game Reserve.

Births
 1 January – Buster Nupen, South African cricketer. (d. 1977)

Deaths
 26 March – Cecil John Rhodes, businessman, mining magnate, imperialist and politician.
 2 May – Jan Stephanus de Villiers, composer and organist, dies in Paarl.

Railways

Railway lines opened
 1 May – Free State – Bloemfontein to Sannaspos, .
 18 July – Natal – Tugela to Mhlatuze, .
 1 August – Cape Midland – Cookhouse to Somerset East, .
 1 August – Cape Midland – Klipplaat to Willowmore, .
 1 August – Cape Western – Sir Lowry's Pass Village to Caledon, .
 15 November – Cape Western – Moorreesburg to Eendekuil, .

Locomotives
Cape
 Four new Cape gauge and three narrow gauge locomotive types enter service on the Cape Government Railways (CGR):
 Fourteen 6th Class bar framed 4-6-0 passenger steam locomotives. In 1912 they will be designated Class 6J on the South African Railways (SAR).
 The last ten 7th Class 4-8-0 Mastodon type locomotives on the Eastern System. In 1912 they will be designated Class 7C on the SAR.
 The first thirteen of twenty-three 8th Class  Mastodon locomotives on the Western, Midland and Eastern Systems. In 1912 they will be designated Class 8 on the SAR.
 A single experimental  "Consolidation" type tandem compound steam locomotive, in 1912 designated Class Experimental 2 on the SAR.
 Three Type A 2-6-0 Mogul type steam locomotives, later to become Class NG7 on the SAR, on the Hopefield narrow gauge branchline that is being constructed from Kalbaskraal.
 Two Type A 2-6-4T Adriatic type narrow gauge locomotives on construction service on the new Avontuur branch that is being built out of Port Elizabeth through the Langkloof.
 A single Type C 0-4-0 narrow gauge tank steam locomotive named Midget on the Avontuur branch.
 Two new Cape gauge locomotive types enter service with the East London and Table Bay Harbour Boards:
 Two 0-6-0 saddle-tank locomotives enter shunting service at the East London Harbour.
 Eleven 2-6-0 saddle-tank locomotives enter harbour shunting service in Table Bay Harbour.

Natal
 The Natal Government Railways places ten Class F  Baltic type tank steam locomotives in service, the first known locomotive in the world to be designed and built as a Baltic. In 1912 they will be designated Class E on the SAR.
 The Natal Harbours Department places a single saddle-tank locomotive named Congella in service as harbour shunter in Durban Harbour.
 The Zululand Railway Company, contractors for the construction of the North Coast line from Verulam to the Tugela River, acquires two 2-6-0 Mogul type tender locomotives as construction engines, later to be designated Class I on the NGR.

Transvaal
 The Imperial Military Railways places forty Cape 8th Class 4-8-0 Mastodon type steam locomotives in service. In 1912 they will be designated Class 8A on the SAR.

References

 
South Africa
Years in South Africa